The following is a list of condiments used in Indian cuisine.

Dried powders

 Ajwain
 Asafetida
 Black salt
 Cardamom powder
 Red chili powder
 Coriander powder
 Curry leaves
 Garam masala
 Ginger, ginger powder
 Himalayan salt
 Jira (Indian cumin seeds)
 Raai
 Turmeric

Chutneys

 Chammanthi podi
 Coriander chutney
 Coconut chutney
 Garlic chutney (made from fresh garlic, coconut and groundnut)
 Hang curd hari mirch pudina chutney (typical north Indian)
 Lime chutney (made from whole, unripe limes)
 Mango chutney (keri) chutney (made from unripe, green mangoes)
 Mint chutney 
 Onion chutney
 Saunth chutney (made from dried ginger and tamarind paste)
 Tamarind chutney (Imli chutney)
 Tomato chutney

Sauces
 Raita (a cucumber curd side-dish)

See also

 List of condiments
 Achar

Condiments
 
Condiments